Karanja Lad is a city of a Municipal council in Washim district in the Indian state of Maharashtra. Karanja is also known as Karanja Lad. The town is named after Saint Karanj. It is often also referred as "Lad'anche Karanja" in honor of Muslim Queen(ra) (Daughter of Nawab). Karanja is a holy place for Hindus, Jains, and Muslims. It is the birthplace of Shri Narasimha Saraswati Swami Maharaj, believed to be the second incarnation of Lord Dattatreya..

Demographics
As of the 2001 Indian census, Karanja had a population of 100,947. Males made up 52% of the population and females 48%. Karanja has an average literacy rate of 72%, higher than the national average of 59.5%. Male literacy rate is 78%, and female literacy is 67%.

Karanja City
Karanja Lad is a city in the Washim district of the Indian state of Maharashtra. It is known for being an important religious center, as well as for its historical significance. The city is home to a number of ancient temples and ancient Mosques, including the Jain Temple [Shri Mulsangh Chandranatha swami], Guru Mandir [Shri Nrusimha Saraswati Gurumaharaj] Jama Masjid, Nagina Masjid, Bibi Saheb dargah and Nawab Subhan Khan Masjid which is dedicated to the [Nawab Subhan Khan] ruler of Mughal empire.

In addition to its religious significance, Karanja is also known for its scenic beauty, with lush green hills, fertile fields, and winding rivers. The city is located in the midst of fertile agricultural land, and is surrounded by lush green forests.

Despite its small size, Karanja Lad is a bustling city, with a vibrant market, and a number of small businesses. The city is well connected to the rest of Maharashtra by road, and has a railway station that connects it to major cities in the region. Work under construction Yavatmal to Murtijapur Broad Gauge Conversion.

In recent years, Karanja has become a popular tourist destination, attracting visitors from across Maharashtra and around the India. The city is known for its rich cultural heritage, and for its friendly, welcoming people.

Karanja Population

As per official census 2011 and population data 2019 of Karanja City, Muslims are the majority in Karanja. Total population of Karanja City is 100,947 as per census 2011. Islam constitutes 49.80% of Karanja City population. Hinduism are minority in Karanja City forming 39.46% of total population.

As of the 2011 Indian census, Karanja had a population of 100,947.

Geography
It has an average elevation of 422 metres (1387 feet). The Adan River flows near Karanja city. It is an important source of domestic water supply to the city. There are three lakes situated in the city, the Rishi Talaw, the Sarang Talaw, and the Chandra Talaw.

Climate
Karanja is normally hot but the wells usually have water all year. Karanja receives an average of 33 inches of rainfall during the monsoon season.

Places of interest

Temples

Karanja is famous for its Nrusimha Saraswati Swami Maharaj temple. Shri Nrusimha Saraswati Gurumaharaj is the second avatar (incarnation) of Lord Dattatreya.  Born in Karanja in 1378, he traveled far and wide in what is now known as the States of Maharashtra, Karnataka, Telangana and Andhra Pradesh.  He achieved Sainthood and performed several miracles.  He imparted spiritual knowledge to his disciples, many of whom themselves attained Sainthood. The Gurumandir Temple conducts several major events to celebrate the various avatars of Lord Dattatreya.  Over the past 100 years, Gurumandir has become a nucleus for religious and social welfare activities in Maharashtra's Vidarbha region.

Other old temples are Vitthal mandir, Chote Ram mandir and as well as famous "Kannao Ram mandir". Each year Ramnavami and other Hindu religious activities are performed in these temples.

Jain temples and institutions

Karanja is the only place in India that had been the set of three Bhatarakas representing three Digambar Jain traditions: Balatkar Gana, Sena Gana and Kastha Sangh. The Balatkar Gana seat had relocated from
Manyakheta.

There are four major Digambar Jain temples in Karanja. The Kastha Sangh temple has extraordinary wooden carvings dating back to at least 14th century. The Sena Gana temple has a "pat" (scroll) painting depicting the Panchkalyanak ceremonies of Jain Tirthankars. This scroll is painted in the Rajasthani style and is around 800 years old. Balatkar Gana temple has a collection of rare manuscripts. In 1926, Prof. Hiralal Jain had discovered 12 unknown Apabhramsha manuscripts here. They were later edited and published, supported by local donors.

Karanja is known as the "Kashi" of Jainism. Also famous is the "Mahaveer Brahmacharyashram" or Gurukul. This place is the site of the first Gurukul founded by Acharya Shri 108 Samantabhadra in 1918 AD, it celebrated its ‘Shatakpurti Mahotsav’ in 2018. The Karanja gurukul has a Jain temple and hostel and education facilities. The Karanja institution was the first of 11 Gurukuls established by Acharya Samantabhadra. Gurukuls based this pattern was later started in Maharashtra (Bahubali, Ellora, Kunthalgiri), Khurai in Madhya Pradesh, and Karnataka (Stawawidhi, Karkal, Terdal, Bellad Bagewadi). The famous Berkeley scholar of Buddhism and Jainism Padmanabh Jaini was a student of the Karanja Gurukul.

Mosques

Karanja is also known as Karanja Bibi such as name refer by BiBi Saheba's Dargah in the bibi Sahebapura. Karanja Lad is also famous for its mosques (masjids). There are as many as 60 mosques in Karanja. The more famous are the Jama Masjid which is a historical mosque built in 981 Hijri(1573) in Mughal Era, and other mosques are Nawab Subhan Khan Masjid, Nagina Masjid, Moti Masjid, Qila Masjid, Usmaniya Masjid, Dapnipura Masjid, GawliPura Masjid, Anwar Masjid, Masjid-E-Umar Farooq (Sarai), Mangalwara Masjid, Makkah Masjid, Madina Masjid, Masjid-E- Fiel, Qalandariya Masjid, Bilal Masjid, Faizan e Madina Masjid, Muhamaddiya Masjid, Imaampura Masjid, Masjid-E-Gaus-E-Azam, Qazi Plot Masjid, Zakariya Masjid, Daipura Masjid, Sabira Masjid Madarsa and Masjid-E-Fatema and Masjid e Ali. Karanja is also known for the Bibi Sahab Dargah, Al Kabeer Dargah, Faizullah Shah Dargah (Fazal Safa), Dulha Rahman Dargha and Lal Imam shah Dargha near Jama Masjid and Many More.

Kannao Mansion
Built in 1905, Kannao Mansion is famous for its use of French/Italian architecture. Kannao Mansion is a 100+-year-old replica of Shrilanka Queen Bungalow. It was also featured in the Marathi channel.

Historical places

The Kannao Bungalow has 307 doors. This is a very old wake of Karanja. And here is saffron musk. This is also included in the Historical Place. Saffron musk is said to have been told that the king of the two thousand sweets was used for the reception of the queen. NAWAB SUBHAN KHAN constructed a wall and four doors around Karanja, namely the Delhi Gate, the Darwha Gate, the Mangrul Gate, and the Poha Gate.

Politics
Hindu, Muslim, and Jain communities are actively involved in the municipal politics of Karanja.  All communities coexist peacefully and with respect for each other's religious sentiments. Prakash Dahake and Yusuf Punjani are considered the most powerful politicians from Karanja. Mr. Dahake was a Member of the Legislative Assembly (MLA) from Karanja and Yusuf Punjani is indirectly ruling Karanja Municipal Council. After the 2014 state elections, Rajendra Patni was elected as the Member of the Legislative Assembly (MLA) from Karanja  defeating Yusuf Punjani by a very narrow margin.

Location

Karanja lad city is located in Washim district. It is located 64 km towards North from District headquarters Washim. 63 km to Amravati (division). Karanja City belongs to Vidarbha region, 222 km to Vidarbha capital of Nagpur and 604 km to State capital of Mumbai.

Transport 
Road

Karanja is well connected to other cities by roads like Malegaon, Washim, Amravati, Akola, Pusad and Mangrulpir.

The Mumbai–Nagpur Expressway also passes through Karanja.

Railway 

Karanja town railway station is 1.5 km from Karanja. it is a very old railway station on the Shakuntala Railway, a narrow gauge train running from Achalpur to Yawatmal.

Murtizapur junction (near Akola) and Badnera junction railway station (near Amravati) are the railway stations reachable from the nearby towns.   

Air 

Nearby airports are 54 km Bellora Amravati regional airport.
68 km to Shioni airport Akola and 207 km to Dr. Babasaheb Ambedkar International airport Nagpur.

Fruit cultivation and market 

Karanja is famous for its fruit market. Karanja has a huge Market of papaya. supplies all over India (Madhya Pradesh, Haryana, Uttar Pradesh, Chhattisgardh, Bihar and Jharkhand, etc.). Karanja is international supplier of papaya (Nepal and Bhutan, etc.).

References

External links
 "S.S.S.K.R. Innani mahavidyalaya karanja lad"
Gurumandir Karanja
"Smt. Shakuntalabai Dhabekar Mahavidyalaya Karanja Lad"
"Weekly Janta Parishad" "janta parishad" "साप्ताहिक जनता परिषद" "जनता परिषद"
"Newsportal - Janta Parishad" "न्यूज पोर्टल - जनता परिषद"
Cities and towns in Washim district
Talukas in Maharashtra